The Thos. D. Murphy Co. Factory and Power Plant, also known as the Thos. D. Murphy Calendar Company, is located in Red Oak, Iowa, United States.  Thomas D. Murphy was the first person who successfully developed advertising art calendars, and is the individual who is most responsible for the creation, development and expansion of the art calendar industry.  The three-story brick building has a four-story projecting pavilion in the center of the main facade.  The Arts and Crafts Movement was the main architectural influence of the structure designed by Omaha architect Harry Lawrie.  The main part of the factory building was completed in 1905 and expanded in 1907 and then again in 1920.  The power plant part of the historic designation was part of the 1920 expansion.  It houses a 120-horsepower Corliss steam engine that was built by the Murray Iron Works of Burlington, Iowa.  It is thought to be one of the last of its kind in Iowa.  It was listed on the National Register of Historic Places in 2008.

References

Industrial buildings completed in 1905
Red Oak, Iowa
Buildings and structures in Montgomery County, Iowa
National Register of Historic Places in Montgomery County, Iowa
Industrial buildings and structures on the National Register of Historic Places in Iowa
1905 establishments in Iowa